Set Your Goals is the debut studio album by the punk rock band CIV. It was released in October 1995 on Lava Records. The album is best known for the hit single "Can't Wait One Minute More."

Although listed as co-producer in the inlay, Walter Schreifels has indicated that he was the main songwriter for the album (despite not being a member of the band).

"Can't Wait One Minute More" and "Choices Made" were released as music videos.

"Can't Wait One Minute More" features vocals from Lou Koller of Sick Of It All.

The San Francisco Bay-area pop punk/hardcore act Set Your Goals named themselves after this album.

Critical reception
Ira Robbins, in Trouser Press, wrote: "Making the most of clear sound, tight, unfussy playing and a full complement of rhythmic shifts (these guys remember when moshing was a dance tempo, not a slamming catch-all), CIV recycles with detailed dignity."

Track listing
"Set Your Goals" - 1:51
"Do Something" - 1:14
"So Far, So Good... So What" - 2:12
"State of Grace" - 1:00
"Can't Wait One Minute More" - 2:32
"Trust Slips Through Your Hands - 1:13
"Gang Opinion" - 1:29
"Choices Made" - 2:29
"Solid Bond" - 1:34
"Marching Goals" - :33
"United Kids" - 2:19
"Soundtrack for Violence" - :32
"Boring Summer" - 2:47
"Et Tu Brute?" - 2:17
"All Twisted" (Kraut cover) - 2:31
"Don't Got to Prove It" - 1:57
"Blessed" - 2:30 (A track hidden in "Don't Got to Prove It")

Personnel
CIV
 CIV (Anthony Civarelli) - Vocals
 Charlie Garriga - Guitar, backing vocals
 Arthur Smilios - Bass, backing vocals
 Sammy Siegler - Drums

Guests
 Lou Koller - vocals on "Can't Wait One Minute More"

Production
 Michael Barbiero - Mixing
 Don Fury - Producer, engineer
 Walter Schreifels - Producer, songwriter
 George Marino - Mastering
 Chris Gibson - Engineer

Artwork
 Marcelo Krasilcic - Photography
 John Mockus - Photography
 Chris Capuozzo - Design

Charts
Album - Billboard (United States)

Singles - Billboard (United States)

References

1995 debut albums
CIV (band) albums
Lava Records albums
Albums produced by Don Fury